Simona Peycheva (born 14 May 1985, in Sofia) is a rhythmic gymnast who represented Bulgaria at the 2004 and 2008 Olympics.

Career 

Peycheva started rhythmic gymnastics in 1991 under coach Marietta Dukova.

She won three gold medals (hoop, ball, and clubs), two silver medals (all-around and rope), and one bronze medal (team) at the 2001 World Championships. At the 2004 Olympics in Athens, she placed 6th in the final with a total score of 101.050 (hoop 25.375, ball 25.675, clubs 25.600, ribbon 24.400). At the 2008 Olympics in Beijing, she finished 10th.

Olympic results

Personal life 
Peycheva is married to Goran Petrov and has a son named Aleksey.

References

External links

Simona Peycheva at Magical Action

1985 births
Living people
Bulgarian rhythmic gymnasts
Gymnasts at the 2004 Summer Olympics
Gymnasts at the 2008 Summer Olympics
Olympic gymnasts of Bulgaria
Doping cases in gymnastics
Medalists at the Rhythmic Gymnastics World Championships
Medalists at the Rhythmic Gymnastics European Championships
Competitors at the 2001 Goodwill Games
Goodwill Games medalists in gymnastics